Christmas Cheers is the second studio album by American men's a cappella singing group, Straight No Chaser, produced with Deke Sharon. It was released in the US on November 3, 2009. It has peaked to number 38 on the U.S. Billboard 200.

Track listing

Charts

Weekly charts

Year-end charts

Certifications

Release history

References

2009 Christmas albums
Christmas albums by American artists
A cappella Christmas albums
Atlantic Records albums
Straight No Chaser (group) albums